Ocracoke may refer to:
 Ocracoke, North Carolina
 Ocracoke Island Light, a lighthouse on Ocracoke island
 Ocracoke Inlet, the inlet at the southern end of Ocracoke Island